The Miercurea Nirajului gas field is a natural gas field located in Miercurea Nirajului, Mureș County. It was discovered in 1915 and developed by and Romgaz. It began production in 1930 and produces natural gas and condensates. The total proven reserves of the Miercurea Nirajului gas field are around 1.42 trillion cubic feet (40 km³), and production is slated to be around 35 million cubic feet/day (1×105m³) in 2010.

References

Natural gas fields in Romania